Bula Quo is the thirtieth studio album and the first soundtrack album by English rock band Status Quo, it was released on Monday 10 June 2013. It is the last Status Quo album recorded with drummer Matt Letley, who announced his departure from the band before the album had been released.

A double album, its release coincides with the band's first feature film of the same name, and features many of the songs from that movie. In addition to nine new songs, the album also features, on its second disc, studio recordings of four of their previously released songs. One of these – "Living on an Island" – is a remake in a Fijian style (in keeping with the film's setting), while "Rockin' All Over the World" features in a special edited version. Two further studio recordings, "Frozen Hero" and "Reality Cheque", were culled from the band's previous studio release, Quid Pro Quo (2011).

The album also features live versions of six other previously released songs, spanning the band's entire career from "Pictures of Matchstick Men" from their debut album, Picturesque Matchstickable Messages from the Status Quo (1968) to "Beginning of the End" (from the 2007 album In Search of the Fourth Chord). These tracks were recorded in concert during 2009 (from Live at Montreux 2009) and 2010 (from the "Official Bootleg" CD that was added to Quid Pro Quo).
To promote the album, Status Quo appeared on BBC One's magazine show The One Show on Tuesday 11 June 2013.

Singles
In the June 2013, the first single from the album "Bula Bula Quo" was released as a download only, it also joined BBC Radio 2's playlist.
August features the second single Looking Out For Caroline

Reception 

Liverpool Sound and Vision described the album as "reliable and still enough to make you smile" and "one for the long term fan" in a mostly positive review.

Track listing

"Looking Out for Caroline" (Francis Rossi, Bob Young) - 4:00
"GoGoGo" (Rick Parfitt, Wayne Morris) - 4:16
"Run and Hide (The Gun Song)" (John Edwards, Stuart St. Paul) - 4:12
"Running Inside My Head" (Matt Letley) - 3:42
"Mystery Island" (Rick Parfitt, Wayne Morris) - 4:22
"All That Money" (Rick Parfitt, Wayne Morris) - 3:13
"Never Leave a Friend Behind" (Andy Bown, Stuart St. Paul) - 2:51
"Fiji Time" (John Edwards) - 3:15
"Bula Bula Quo (Kua Ni Lega)" (Francis Rossi, Bob Young) - 3:50
"Living on an Island (Fiji Style)" (Rick Parfitt, Bob Young) - 3:45
"Frozen Hero" (Francis Rossi, Andy Bown) - 4:20
"Reality Cheque" (Rick Parfitt, John Edwards) - 4:05
"Rockin' All Over the World" (Bula Edit)" (John Cameron Fogerty) - 4:27
"Caroline" (Live 2009) (Francis Rossi, Bob Young) - 6:19
"Beginning of the End" (Live 2010) (Francis Rossi, John Edwards) - 4:25
"Don't Drive My Car" (Live 2010) (Rick Parfitt, Andy Bown) - 3:49
"Pictures of Matchstick Men" (Live 2009) (Francis Rossi) - 2:29
"Whatever You Want" (Live 2010) (Rick Parfitt, Andy Bown) - 5:10
"Down Down" (Live 2010) (Francis Rossi, Bob Young) - 5:04

Personnel
Status Quo
Francis Rossi – lead vocals, lead guitar
Rick Parfitt – lead vocals, rhythm guitar
Andy Bown – keyboards, guitars, backing vocals
John Edwards – bass, guitars, backing vocals
Matt Letley – drums

Additional musicians
Wayne Morris – extra guitars and backing vocals ("Go Go Go", "Mystery Island" and "All That Money")
Freddie Edwards – extra guitars ("Run And Hide (The Gun Song)")
Amy Smith – backing vocals ("Looking for Caroline", "Running Inside My Head", "Fiji Time", "Bula Bula Quo (Kua Ni Lega)" and "Living on an Island (Fiji Style)")
Kathy Edwards – backing vocals ("Fiji Time")
Amber Zakatek – backing vocals ("Bula Bula Quo (Kua Ni Lega)")
Fursey Rossi – backing vocals ("Bula Bula Quo (Kua Ni Lega)")
Recorded at ARSIS Studios During 2012

Charts

Certifications

References

Status Quo (band) albums
2013 soundtrack albums
Albums produced by Mike Paxman